Gordan Zdravkov (born 26 April 1959) is a Macedonian football coach and former player. He was a currently assistant coach of FK Ovce Pole.

References

External sources
 

1959 births
Living people
People from Sveti Nikole
Association football midfielders
Yugoslav footballers
Macedonian footballers
FK Bregalnica Štip players
FK Vardar players
FC Linz players
Yugoslav First League players
Austrian Football Bundesliga players
Macedonian football managers
FK Bregalnica Štip managers
FK Rabotnički managers
FK Belasica managers
FK Pelister managers
FK Horizont Turnovo managers
FK Napredok managers
FK Sileks managers